RTV Novi Pazar is a Serbian commercial television channel with regional coverage.

Company headquarters is located in Novi Pazar. Since 14 August 2015., television channel is privately owned. The program is mainly dedicated to local news from Sandžak and Raška region.

References

External links

Television stations in Serbia
Television channels and stations established in 2002
Multilingual broadcasters